Coleophora hirsutella is a species of moth in the family Coleophoridae. It is found in Namibia.

References 

 

hirsutella
Moths described in 2015
Moths of Africa